Jennifer Smith (born 13 July 1945 in Lisbon, Portugal) graduated from the  and went to London on a Gulbenkian scholarship. Her varied recording career includes opera and recital from baroque to modern. She appeared in Tony Palmer's 1995 television film on Henry Purcell, "England My England". She was professor of vocal studies and French Mélodie at the Royal College of Music, London, from 1997 to 2007. She now lives in Vendée, France. She has two children, singer-songwriter Carmen Smith and author Joseph Smith.

Sources
Cummings, David (ed.), "Smith, Jennifer", International Who's Who in Music, Routledge, 2000, p. 602. 
Hyperion Records, Jennifer Smith (soprano):biography and disscography accessed 28 January 2008
Warrack, John and West, Ewan, "Smith, Jennifer", The Concise Oxford Dictionary of Opera, Oxford University Press, 1996 (accessed online via subscription 28 January 2008)

External links
 Official Website for Jennifer Smith, Soprano

1945 births
Living people
Academics of the Royal College of Music
Singers from Lisbon
Portuguese operatic sopranos
20th-century Portuguese women opera singers
Women music educators